Davenport Speedway is a half-mile dirt race track located in Davenport, Iowa. In 1953, the track became the first track in Iowa to host a NASCAR sanctioned event, when it held a Grand National Series race. Fourteen cars participated in race. Buck Baker won the pole and Herb Thomas was victorious in the race.

References

External links
Track statistics at racing-reference.info
Davenport Speedway Website

Buildings and structures in Davenport, Iowa
NASCAR tracks
Motorsport venues in Iowa
Tourist attractions in Davenport, Iowa